Todd Dean Hunter (born 1956) is an American author, church planter, and bishop in the Anglican Church in North America (ACNA). He was the founding pastor of Holy Trinity Anglican Church in Costa Mesa, California (2009–2019). Prior to being received into Anglicanism in 2009, Hunter was a leader in the charismatic Vineyard movement. He has also been affiliated with a number of evangelical movements and organizations during his career, including the Jesus Movement, Calvary Chapel, and Alpha.

Hunter is the author of Christianity Beyond Belief: Following Jesus for the Sake of Others, Giving Church Another Chance, The Outsider Interviews, The Accidental Anglican, Our Favorite Sins, Our Character at Work, and Deep Peace.

Early career and the Vineyard
Hunter was converted to Christianity in 1976 as part of the Jesus Movement. He completed his B.S. in business administration from Cal Poly Pomona and in 1979 moved to Wheeling, West Virginia, with his wife, Debbie Hunter, to plant a Calvary Chapel-affiliated church.

The Wheeling church later became affiliated with the Vineyard, and Hunter was hired by John Wimber in 1987 as a Senior Associate pastor at Anaheim Vineyard Christian Fellowship and to help start the Association of Vineyard Churches. In 1991, Hunter moved to Virginia Beach, to oversee Vineyard churches in the Southeast. While there, he completed an M.A. in Biblical studies at Regent University. He returned to Southern California in 1994 as national coordinator of the Vineyard, and after Wimber's death in 1997, served for four years as president of the Vineyard.

Church planting

In 2009 at the urging of AMiA chair Chuck Murphy and in recognition of his role as an overseer of churches in the West, Hunter was consecrated as a bishop in AMiA. Archbishop Emmanuel Kolini of Rwanda was the chief consecrator, and Rick Warren preached at the consecration service.

Transition to ACNA
In late 2011 Hunter was one of nine AMiA bishops to resign from the Rwandan House of Bishops after a controversy between Murphy and new Rwandan archbishop Onesphore Rwaje over AMiA oversight. In 2012, Hunter expressed regret over his actions, reporting "that he had asked for and had received forgiveness from... Rwaje for 'my part in actions, attitudes or communications that were hurtful to him or to my brother bishops in Rwanda.'"

Notes

Bibliography
Giving Church Another Chance: Finding New Meaning in Spiritual Practices (InterVarsity Press, 2010)
Christianity Beyond Belief: Following Jesus for the Sake of Others (InterVarsity Press, 2010)
The Accidental Anglican: The Surprising Appeal of the Liturgical Church (InterVarsity Press, 2010)
Our Favorite Sins: The Sins We Commit and How You Can Quit (Thomas Nelson, 2012)
Our Character at Work: Success from the Heart of Servant Leadership (Wheatmark, 2016)
Deep Peace: Finding Calm in a World of Conflict and Anxiety (Zondervan, 2021) (ISBN 978-0310120438)

1956 births
Living people
Bishops of the Anglican Church in North America
Western Seminary
Christians from California